Danny Eyles is a professional racing driver, competing in the British Drift Championship, Prodrift Super Series, European Drift Championship and JDM Allstars series.

Since winning the amateur competition final at Teesside Autodrome in 2006 in his Nissan Skyline R33, Danny was approached by Team JapSpeed, and was proud to accept the offer of some sponsorship for the following season in 2007 in the Eurodrift Pro class.

This year Danny and teammate Shane Lynch obtained European Drift Championship licences, and later won the team drift event at Knockhill Circuit

The following year, Danny achieved consistent results in the EDC, however at the second round at Silverstone Circuit, Danny and teammate Shane Lynch had a huge collision, totalling both cars.

For 2009, Team Japspeed built two purpose built Nissan Silvia S15 drift cars for Shane and Danny to replace the cars which were totalled. For this season Team Japspeed competed in the British Drift Championship and Prodrift Super Series. Danny achieved his first win in the new car at the Prodrift event at Donington Park, and won both final rounds of the BDC. Danny finished the BDC season in second place behind teammate Steve Biagioni, and fourth in Prodrift.

In 2011 he left the Japspeed team and was replaced by Shane O'Sullivan.

External links 
 Team Japspeed

English racing drivers
Drifting drivers
Living people
Place of birth missing (living people)
Year of birth missing (living people)